Dawn of the End is the tenth album by Runemagick. It was released in 2007 on Aftermath Music.

Track listing
 "Dawn of the End" - 5:50
 "Voyage of Desolation" - 11:37
 "Chthonic Temple Smoke" - 10:11
 "Metalination" - 8:49
 "Volcano Throne" - 7:37
 "The Circle" - 4:49
 "Magus of Fire" - 9:37
 "Sabbatum ad Infinitum" - 3:37

Credits
 Nicklas "Terror" Rudolfsson - Vocals, Guitar
 Emma Karlsson - Bass
 Daniel Moilanen - Drums

Runemagick albums
2007 albums